Mykola Vasylyovych Fomin (born in 1905 in Kharkiv; died in 1975 in Kharkiv) was a Soviet football player. He was a brother to Volodymyr and Kostiantyn Fomins.

Honours
 USSR champion: 1924.

International career
Fomin played his only game for USSR on July 30, 1933 in a friendly against Turkey.

External links
  Profile
 Profile at the allfutbolist.ru
 Biography at the Kopanyi-myach.info
 

1900s births
1975 deaths
Footballers from Kharkiv
People from Kharkovsky Uyezd
FC Dynamo Kharkiv players
FC Dynamo Kharkiv managers
Ukrainian footballers
Soviet footballers
Soviet Top League players
Association football midfielders
Ukrainian football managers